The discography of Flogging Molly, an Irish-American Celtic punk band, consists of six studio albums, three live albums, one extended play, fifteen singles and eight music videos.

Albums

Studio albums

Live albums

Extended plays

Singles

Music videos

References

External links 
 Official band website
 Flogging Molly at AllMusic
 

Punk rock group discographies
Discographies of American artists